Branthwaite is a hamlet in the borough of Allerdale, Cumbria, England. It is located just outside the Lake District National Park. In 1870-72 the township had a population of 281.

Amenities 
Branthwaite  has few amenities, there is one public house, The Wild Duck. The River Marron runs through Branthwaite. There is a former trout farm. There is also a former mill, which is now home to the local motor engineering business.

Branthwaite Hall is an old peel tower that is in between Branthwaite and Dean.

Governance
Branthwaite is in the parliamentary constituency of Copeland, Trudy Harrison is the Member of Parliament.

For Local Government purposes it is in the Dalton Ward of Allerdale Borough Council and part of the Cockermouth South Ward of Cumbria County Council.

Branthwaite does not have its own parish council, instead it is part of Dean Parish Council, which also covers villages of  Dean, Deanscales, Eaglesfield, Pardshaw and Ullock.

Notable people
Malcolm Wilson (born 1956), rally driver and rally-team owner

References

External links
  Cumbria County History Trust: Dean (nb: provisional research only - see Talk page)

Hamlets in Cumbria
Dean, Cumbria